Nge Kywan Swe is a 1968 Burmese black-and-white drama film, directed by Bogalay Tint Aung starring Htun Htun Win, Aung Lwin, Nwet Nwet Mu and Aye Aye Thin.

Cast
Htun Htun Win
Aung Lwin
Nwet Nwet Mu
Aye Aye Thin

References

1968 films
1960s Burmese-language films
Burmese black-and-white films
Films shot in Myanmar
1968 drama films
Burmese drama films